The 6th FINA World Junior Swimming Championships, was held in Indianapolis, United States. The championships were for girls aged 14–17 and boys age 15–18. Over 600 athletes from 90 different countries competed at the Championships.

Host selection
Hosting rights were originally awarded to Budapest, Hungary, but they decided to withdraw since they were already hosting the 2017 World Aquatics Championships. Budapest is scheduled to host the 2019 FINA World Junior Swimming Championships. Host city Indianapolis has previously hosted U.S. Olympic Trials 4 times since 1982.

Venue
The event was held at the Indiana University Natatorium, which is best known for hosting the 1987 Pan American Games. The pool is on the campus of Purdue University.

Medal summary

Medal table

Men

Women

Mixed

Notes
Relay medalists in italics participated in the heats only.
 Subsequently broken by Taylor Ruck in the women's 4×100 freestyle relay.
 Not recognized as a record as it was set in a mixed relay.

Matthew Willenbring of USA originally finished third in men's 100m freestyle, but later was disqualified for doping. FINA also decided to disqualify men's 4×100m freestyle and 4×100m medley relays and 4x100m mixed freestyle relay in which Willenbring had swum.

Participating countries
Competitors from the following 90 countries participated at the Championships.

References

External links
Results

FINA World Junior Swimming Championships
International aquatics competitions hosted by the United States
Swimming competitions in Indiana
Sports competitions in Indianapolis
FINA World Junior Swimming Championships
FINA World Junior Swimming Championships
FINA World Junior Swimming Championships
FINA World Junior Swimming Championships